Jiří Lundák (born 31 August 1939 in Prague) is a Czech rower who competed for Czechoslovakia in the 1960 Summer Olympics and in the 1964 Summer Olympics.

In 1960 he was a crew member of the Czechoslovak boat which won the bronze medal in the eights event.

Four years later he won his second bronze medal with the Czechoslovak boat in the eights competition.

External links
 profile

1939 births
Living people
Czech male rowers
Czechoslovak male rowers
Olympic rowers of Czechoslovakia
Rowers at the 1960 Summer Olympics
Rowers at the 1964 Summer Olympics
Olympic bronze medalists for Czechoslovakia
Olympic medalists in rowing
Medalists at the 1964 Summer Olympics
Medalists at the 1960 Summer Olympics
Rowers from Prague
European Rowing Championships medalists